Daniel Mubiru (born October 25, 1976) is a Ugandan football (soccer) midfielder for Ugandan Premier League club Police Jinja.

Career 
He began his career by Villa SC in the Ugandan Premier League, before 2003 moving to Police Jinja.

International 
Mubiru played from 2002 to 2004 for the Uganda national football team.

External links

1976 births
Ugandan footballers
Uganda international footballers
Living people
Association football midfielders
SC Villa players